The 35th Filmfare Awards were held in 1990.

Maine Pyaar Kiya led the ceremony with 12 nominations, followed by Chandni with 10 nominations, and Ram Lakhan with 9 nominations.

Sooraj Barjatya's Maine Pyaar Kiya won 6 awards, including Best Film, thus becoming the most-awarded film at the ceremony.

Vidhu Vinod Chopra's Parinda was the other big winner on the night with 5 awards, including Best Director (for Vidhu Vinod Chopra), Best Actor (for Jackie Shroff) and Best Supporting Actor (for Nana Patekar).

This rivalry between Sooraj Barjatya and Vidhu Vinod Chopra resurfaced at the 40th Filmfare Awards, where once again Barjatya's Hum Aapke Hain Kaun beat out Chopra's 1942: A Love Story for Best Film.

Sridevi received dual nominations for Best Actress for her performances in Chaalbaaz and Chandni, winning for the former.

Main awards

Most Sensational Debut
 Sooraj Barjatya – Maine Pyar Kiya

Lux Face of the Year
 Bhagyashree – Maine Pyar Kiya

Best Screenplay
 Shiv Kumar Subramaniam – Parinda

Best Choreography
 Saroj Khan – "Na Jaane Kahan Se Aayi Hai" – Chaalbaaz

Best Cinematography
 Chandni

Best Editing
 Parinda

Best Sound
 Tridev

Critics' awards

Best Film
 Khayal Gatha

Best Documentary
 Siddeswari

Biggest Winners
Maine Pyaar Kiya – 6/12
Parinda – 5/6
Ram Lakhan – 3/9
Chaalbaaz – 2/3
Tridev – 2/6
Chandni – 1/10
Eeshwar – 1/3

References
https://www.imdb.com/event/ev0000245/1990/

See also
 37th Filmfare Awards
 36th Filmfare Awards
 Filmfare Awards

Filmfare Awards
Filmfare